The Treasury Island tree frog (Ranoidea thesaurensis) is a species of frog in the subfamily Pelodryadinae. It is found in New Guinea and the Solomon Islands. Its natural habitats are subtropical or tropical moist lowland forests, subtropical or tropical moist montane forests, swamps, freshwater marshes, intermittent freshwater marshes, rural gardens, heavily degraded former forests, and canals and ditches. It is threatened by habitat loss.

References

Ranoidea 
Amphibians described in 1877
Taxa named by Wilhelm Peters
Taxonomy articles created by Polbot